Maha Thetkya Yanthi Buddha) is a Buddhist temple in Ottarathiri Township, Naypyidaw Union Territory, Myanmar that houses a  marble image of the standing Buddha that weighs . The image was enshrined on 20 June 2015 in the Gandhakuṭi Pavilion (ဂန္ဓကုဋိကျောင်းဆောင်). Construction efforts were undertaken by ACE Construction Group, owned by Tint Hsan.

See also
 Buddhism in Myanmar

References

Buddhist temples in Myanmar
Buildings and structures in Naypyidaw
21st-century Buddhist temples
Religious buildings and structures completed in 2015
2015 establishments in Myanmar